The bay pipefish (Syngnathus leptorhynchus) is a pipefish native to the eelgrass beds of the Eastern Pacific (Southern Baja California to Gulf of Alaska), where its sinuous shape and green color allow it to blend in with the waving blades of eelgrass.  Like other members of the seahorse family, male pipefish tend the eggs laid by their female partners in specialized pouches.

References

bay pipefish
Fauna of the San Francisco Bay Area
Fish of the Western United States
Western North American coastal fauna
bay pipefish